Bai Xiaoyun (born 15 June 1973), is a retired Chinese sprinter who specialized in the 400 metres.

She is the current Asian record holder in the 4 x 400 metres relay in a time of 3:24.28 seconds, achieved in September 1993 in Beijing with Cao Chunying, An Xiaohong and Ma Yuqin.

Achievements

References
All-Athletics profile for Bai Xiaoyun

1973 births
Living people
Chinese female sprinters
Runners from Hebei
20th-century Chinese women